Pope is a Scottish surname meaning "father".

Albert Augustus Pope (1843–1909), American bicycle and automobile manufacturer
Alexander Pope (1688–1744), English poet
Alexander Pope (actor) (1763–1835), Irish actor and painter
Anson W. Pope (1812–1871), American politician
Arthur Upham Pope (1881–1969), American archaeologist and historian
Barbara S. Pope (born 1951), U.S. Department of Defense official
Barton C. Pope (1813–1862), Florida state representative
Bill Pope (born 1952), American cinematographer
Brent Pope (rugby analyst) (born 1962), New Zealand-born rugby analyst for Irish television
Carl C. Pope (1834–1911), American legislator and jurist
Carly Pope (born 1980), Canadian actress
Carole Pope (born 1950), Canadian singer
Cassadee Pope (born 1989), American singer
Charles Pope (disambiguation), several people
Cheryl Pope (fl. 2000s–2020s), American artist
Christopher Pope (fl. 1970s–2020s), American physicist
Clifford H. Pope (1899–1974), American herpetologist
Cora Scott Pond Pope (1856–after 1932), American teacher, pageant writer, real estate developer
Duane Earl Pope (born 1943), American bank robber and murderer
Dudley Pope (1925–1997), British author
Dudley Pope (cricketer) (1906–1934), English cricketer
Eddie Pope (born 1973), American football (soccer) player
Edmund Mann Pope (1837–1906), American military officer and politician
Edwin Pope (1928–2017), American journalist
Eva Pope (born 1967), English actress
Everett P. Pope (1919–2009), US Marine Corps officer and recipient of the Medal of Honor
Frankie Pope (1884–1953), English association footballer
Fred Pope (1909–1983), Scottish association footballer
Generoso Pope (1891–1950), Italian-American businessman
Generoso Pope Jr. (1927–1988), American media mogul
Georgina Pope (1862–1938), Canadian military nurse
Gustav Pope (1831–1910), British painter
Hugh Pope (1869–1946), English Dominican biblical scholar
James Pope (disambiguation), several people
Jessie Pope (1868–1941), English poet
John Pope (disambiguation), several people
Kyle Pope (fl. 2010s–2020s), American editor and publisher
Laurence Pope (1945–2020), American diplomat
Lawrence Pope (1940–2013), American lawyer and legislator
Leonard Pope (born 1983), American football player
Leslie Pope (1954–2020), American set decorator
Lloyd Pope (born 1999), Australian cricketer
Lucas Pope (born 1977/78), American video game developer
Lynda Pope (born 1953), Australian chess player
Mal Pope (born 1960), Welsh musician
Marion Manville Pope (1859–1930), American poet, author, traveler, philanthropist
Mark Pope (born 1972), American basketball player
Martin Pope (1918–2022), American physical chemist
Nathaniel Pope (1784–1850), American politician and judge of Illinois
Nick Pope (disambiguation), several people
Norm Pope (1908–1985), Australian rugby league footballer
Odean Pope (born 1938), American tenor saxophonist
Ollie Pope (born 1998), English cricketer
Paul Pope (born 1970), American alternative cartoonist
Peggy Pope (1929–2020), American actress
Percival C. Pope (1841–1922), American Marine Corps Brevet Medal recipient
Roland Pope (1864–1952), Australian cricketer and ophthalmologist
Spencer Pope (1893–1976), American football player
Tim Pope (born 1956), music video director
Tom Pope (born 1985), English association footballer
Tony Pope (1947–2004), American voice actor
Vyvyan Pope (1891–1941), British World War II General
Walter Pope (1627–1714), English astronomer and writer
Walter Elmer Pope (1879–1944), American politician and lawyer
Walter Lyndon Pope (1889–1969), United States federal court judge

Nickname
Eoin O'Mahony (politician) (1905–1970), Irish barrister, genealogist, and political activist referred to as Eoin "the Pope" O'Mahony
Paul Castellano (1915–1985), Mafia boss frequently referred to as "The Pope"
Donn Pall (born 1962), American baseball player nicknamed "The Pope"
The Pope (wrestler) (born 1978), a ring name of Elijah Burke

See also
Popé (1630–1688), Pueblo leader
Popo (disambiguation)

Lists of people by nickname